Lorenzo Musetti was the defending champion but chose not to defend his title.

Mats Moraing won the title after defeating Quentin Halys 3–6, 6–1, 7–5 in the final.

Seeds

Draw

Finals

Top half

Bottom half

References

External links
Main draw
Qualifying draw

Internazionali di Tennis Città di Forlì - 1
Internazionali di Tennis Città di Forlì